Hypatopa titanella is a moth in the family Blastobasidae. It is found in North America, including Nova Scotia and Maine.

References

Moths described in 1961
Hypatopa